The 2018 Electric Ireland Fitzgibbon Cup was the 102nd staging of the Fitzgibbon Cup since its establishment in 1912. In the final on 24 February, the University of Limerick defeated DCU by 2-21 to 2-15.

2017-18 Group A Qualifying

Qualifiers: University College Dublin; University College Cork

2017-18 Group B Qualifying

Qualifiers: University of Limerick; Dublin Institute of Technology

2017-18 Group C Qualifying

Qualifiers: DCU Dóchas Éireann; Limerick Institute of Technology

2017-18 Group D Qualifying

Qualifiers: IT Carlow; Mary Immaculate College Limerick

2017-18 Finals Tournament

References

External links
 gaa.ie Higher Education Fixtures

Fitzgibbon
Fitzgibbon Cup